Nova Basan is a village (selo) of Ukraine, in Nizhyn Raion, Chernihiv Oblast. It hosts the administration of Nova Basan rural hromada, one of the hromadas of Ukraine.

History 
In 1897, a post office was opened in Nova Basan. According to the Russian Empire Census of 1897, it had a population 7326, of whom 3460 were men and 3866 women. 6930 were Orthodox.

During the 2022 Russian Invasion of Ukraine, the village was occupied by Russia after the initial invasion but was retaken by Ukraine in early April.

Demographics 
According to the 1989 USSR Census, the village had a population of 4017, of whom 1700 were men and 2317 women.

According to the 2001 Ukrainian census, the village had a population of 3282.

Languages 
The native languages of its inhabitants, according to the 2001 census:

Notable people 

 Yurii Hlushko-Mova (1882 —1942), Ukrainian public and political figure.

 Lev Biryik, Ukrainian politician.
 Vasyl Lopata, Ukrainian artist and author.

References 

Kozeletsky Uyezd
Villages in Nizhyn Raion